Summit Township is a township in O'Brien County, Iowa, USA.

History
Summit Township was founded in 1873.

References

Townships in O'Brien County, Iowa
Townships in Iowa